Calathea pallidicosta is a species of plant in the Marantaceae family. It is endemic to Ecuador.  Its natural habitat is subtropical or tropical moist montane forests.

References

Flora of Ecuador
pallidicosta
Near threatened plants
Taxonomy articles created by Polbot